Making Love ... The Very Best of Air Supply is the second compilation album by British/Australian soft rock duo Air Supply, released in 1983. Earlier that year, Greatest Hits was also issued and included "Making Love Out of Nothing at All", which was issued as a new single in August. The earlier compilation had nine tracks and is missing "Two Less Lonely People in the World", "Keeping the Love Alive" and "Now and Forever".

Track listing

References

External links 

1983 greatest hits albums
Air Supply compilation albums
Arista Records compilation albums